WRTB (95.3 FM, "The Bull") is a country music radio station licensed to serve Winnebago, Illinois, and serving the Rockford, Illinois, market. Before flipping to country, WRTB used the Bob FM format from August 1, 2006, to February 21, 2014.

History
The stations call letters were WRVI beginning in 1967, then WYFE-FM from 1974 to 1985. Its sister station was WYFE-AM (now silent). Together they were known locally as "The Great Ones...AM 1150 and FM 95" airing 'gold' formats.

From 1985 to 2000 the station was a popular oldies format with the call letters WKMQ.  In 2000, the format was changed to classic hits as Y95 and call letters WYHY.  The first lineup of WYHY featured Riley O Neil and Sky Drysdale, within the first ratings period the station went to #1.  From 2002 to 2003 the station evolved into a classic rock format, and syndicated Bob & Tom moved from sister WXRX.  In the mid-2000s following the sale to Maverick Media, the station changed formats again to Bob FM and call letters to WRTB.

On February 21, 2014, at 3:00 pm, WRTB changed their format to country, branded as "95.3 The Bull". The last song on 95.3 Bob FM was Talk To Ya Later by The Tubes, while the first song on 95.3 The Bull was How Do You Like Me Now?! by Toby Keith.

References

External links

RTB
Mass media in Rockford, Illinois